Cristophe Medaillon (born 11 January 1973) is a French former professional footballer who played as a midfielder.

External links
 
 

1973 births
Living people
Sportspeople from Tarbes
Association football midfielders
French footballers
Red Star F.C. players
AS Saint-Étienne players
Ligue 1 players
Ligue 2 players
Pau FC players